Municipal Okrug 75 is a municipal okrug in Frunzensky District, one of the eighty-one low-level municipal divisions  of the federal city of St. Petersburg, Russia. As of the 2010 Census, its population was 50,757.

Overview
The western part of the district, adjacent to Bukharestskaya street, is occupied by multi-storey residential buildings. In the eastern part there is an industrial zone, as well as a cemetery "In memory of the victims of January 9".

Public transport is represented by a tram line along Bucharest Street, as well as bus routes. Obukhovo metro station and Obukhovo railway station are located near the eastern border of the district.

References

Frunzensky District, Saint Petersburg